is a passenger railway station located in the city of Kawachinagano, Osaka Prefecture, Japan, operated by the private railway operator Nankai Electric Railway. It has the station number "NK73".

Lines

Layout
The station consists of two ground-level opposed side platforms connected by an underground passage.

Platforms

Adjacent stations

History
Amami Station opened on March 11, 1915.

Passenger statistics
In fiscal 2019, the station was used by an average of 335 passengers daily.

Surrounding area
 Amami Onsen Nantenen
 Mt. Iwawaki
 Kawachinagano City Amami Elementary School

See also
 List of railway stations in Japan

References

External links

 Amami Station from Nankai Electric Railway website 

Railway stations in Japan opened in 1915
Railway stations in Osaka Prefecture
Kawachinagano